Broadwater Development is a casino holding company that is privately owned by Roy Anderson III, owner of Roy Anderson Corporation construction company, W.C. "Cotton" Fore, president of Gulfport-based W.C. Fore Trucking Inc., and Miami-based Dezer Development Group.

History
On January 20, 2005, the company won a bid for the President Casino Broadwater Resort for $82 million in a bankruptcy action. Foxwoods Development abandoned plans to purchase  of land from Broadwater for a casino on April 26, 2006. 

In June 2020, the company announced an agreement with Dakia Entertainment Hospitality to develop a $1.2 billion, 266-acre entertainment facility by summer 2023 in Biloxi, MI.

References

External links
Sports Toto
Sports Betting

Gambling companies of the United States